Mount Nebo is an unincorporated community in Allegheny County, in the U.S. state of Pennsylvania.

History
The community was named after Mount Nebo, a place mentioned in the Bible.

References

Unincorporated communities in Allegheny County, Pennsylvania
Unincorporated communities in Pennsylvania